The fifty-second edition of the Caribbean Series (Serie del Caribe) was played in . It was held from February 2 through February 7 with the champions teams from Dominican Republic (Leones del Escogido), Mexico (Naranjeros de Hermosillo), Puerto Rico (Indios de Mayagüez) and Venezuela (Leones del Caracas). The format consisted of 12 games, in a double round-robin format with each team facing each other twice. The games were played at Estadio Nueva Esparta in Porlamar, Margarita Island, Venezuela.

Summary

Final standings

Individual leaders

All-Star Team

Scoreboards

Game 1, February 2

Game 2, February 2

Game 3, February 3

Game 4, February 3

Game 5, February 4

Game 6, February 4

Game 7, February 5

Game 8, February 5

Game 9, February 6

Game 10, February 6

Game 11, February 7

Game 12, February 7

 Note: Darío Veras earned his series career 7th save to set an all-time record.

Sources
Minor League Baseball.com
ESPN.com

Caribbean Series
2010 in baseball
2010 in Caribbean sport
Caribbean Series, 2010
International baseball competitions hosted by Venezuela
Caribbean Series